Guidobaldo is a given name. Notable people with the name include:

Guidobaldo Abatini (1600–1656), Italian painter of the Baroque period, active mainly in Rome and Usigni
Guidobaldo del Monte (1545–1607), Italian mathematician, philosopher and astronomer
Guidobaldo da Montefeltro (1472–1508), Italian condottiero and the Duke of Urbino from 1482 to 1508
Guidobaldo II della Rovere, Duke of Urbino (1514–1574), Italian condottiero, Duke of Urbino from 1538 until his death
 Stadio Raul Guidobaldi, a stadium in Rieti, Italy

See also
Portrait of Federico da Montefeltro with His Son Guidobaldo, by Pedro Berruguete, dating from c. 1475
Portrait of Guidobaldo da Montefeltro, by Raphael, dating from around 1506
Guido Ubaldus (disambiguation)
Guidoval